Birger Lie (20 October 1891 – 22 September 1970) was a Norwegian sport shooter. He was born in Åsnes, and his club was Aasnes Skytterlag. He competed in the military rifle (three positions) event at the 1912 Summer Olympics in Stockholm.

References

1891 births
1970 deaths
People from Åsnes
Shooters at the 1912 Summer Olympics
Olympic shooters of Norway
Norwegian male sport shooters
Sportspeople from Innlandet
20th-century Norwegian people